Kanenohana Takeo (born 11 October 1936 as Takeo Kanai) is a former sumo wrestler from Yokohama, Kanagawa, Japan. He made his professional debut in May 1952 and reached the top division in March 1958. His highest rank was komusubi. He left the sumo world upon retirement from active competition in September 1967.

Pre-modern career record

In 1953 the New Year tournament was begun and the Spring tournament began to be held in Osaka.

Modern career record
Since the addition of the Kyushu tournament in 1957 and the Nagoya tournament in 1958, the yearly schedule has remained unchanged.

See also
Glossary of sumo terms
List of past sumo wrestlers
List of sumo tournament second division champions
List of komusubi

References

1936 births
Living people
Japanese sumo wrestlers
Sumo people from Kanagawa Prefecture
Komusubi
People from Yokohama